Days is a surname. Notable people with the surname include:

Alice T. Days, American documentary filmmaker
Braheme Days Jr. (born 1995), American shot putter
Darius Days (born 1999), American basketball player
Dave Days (born 1991), American musician
Drew S. Days III (1941–2020), American lawyer
Rita Heard Days (born 1950), American politician

See also
Day (surname)